Parent–offspring conflict (POC) is an expression coined in 1974 by Robert Trivers. It is used to describe the evolutionary conflict arising from differences in optimal parental investment (PI) in an offspring from the standpoint of the parent and the offspring. PI is any investment by the parent in an individual offspring that decreases the parent's ability to invest in other offspring, while the selected offspring's chance of surviving increases.

POC occurs in sexually reproducing species and is based on a genetic conflict: Parents are equally related to each of their offspring and are therefore expected to equalize their investment among them. Offspring are only half or less related to their siblings (and fully related to themselves), so they try to get more PI than the parents intended to provide even at their siblings' disadvantage. 
However, POC is limited by the close genetic relationship between parent and offspring: If an offspring obtains additional PI at the expense of its siblings, it decreases the number of its surviving siblings. Therefore, any gene in an offspring that leads to additional PI decreases (to some extent) the number of surviving copies of itself that may be located in siblings. Thus, if the costs in siblings are too high, such a gene might be selected against despite the benefit to the offspring. 
The problem of specifying how an individual is expected to weigh a relative against itself has been examined by W. D. Hamilton in 1964 in the context of kin selection. Hamilton's rule says that altruistic behavior will be positively selected if the benefit to the recipient multiplied by the genetic relatedness of the recipient to the performer is greater than the cost to the performer of a social act. Conversely, selfish behavior can only be favoured when Hamilton's inequality is not satisfied. This leads to the prediction that, other things being equal, POC will be stronger under half siblings (e.g., unrelated males father a female's successive offspring) than under full siblings.

Occurrence

In plants
In plants, POC over the allocation of resources to the brood members may affect both brood size (number of seeds matured within a single fruit) and seed size. Concerning brood size, the most economic use of maternal resources is achieved by packing as many seeds as possible in one fruit, i.e., minimizing the cost of packing per seed. In contrast, offspring benefits from low numbers of seeds per fruit, which reduces sibling competition before and after dispersal. Conflict over seed size arises because there usually exists an inverse exponential relationship between seed size and fitness, that is, the fitness of a seed increases at a diminishing rate with resource investment but the fitness of the maternal parent has an optimum, as demonstrated by Smith and Fretwell (see also marginal value theorem). However, the optimum resource investment from the offspring's point of view would be the amount that optimizes its inclusive fitness (direct and indirect fitness), which is higher than the maternal parent's optimum.

This conflict about resource allocation is most obviously manifested in the reduction of brood size (i.e. a decrease in the proportion of ovules matured into seeds). Such reduction can be assumed to be caused by the offspring: If the maternal parent's interest were to produce as few seeds as observed, selection would not favour the production of extra ovules that do not mature into seeds. (Although other explanations for this phenomenon exist, such as genetic load, resource depletion or maternal regulation of offspring quality, they could not be supported by experiments.)

There are several possibilities how the offspring can affect paternal resource allocation to brood members. Evidence exists for siblicide by dominant embryos:  Embryos formed early kill the remaining embryos through an aborting chemical. In oaks, early fertilized ovules prevent the fertilization of other ovules by inhibiting the pollen tube entry into the embryo sac. In some species, the maternal parent has evolved postfertilization abortion of few seeded pods. Nevertheless, cheating by the offspring is also possible here, namely by late siblicide, when the postfertilization abortion has ceased.

According to the general POC model, reduction of brood size – if caused by POC – should depend on genetic relatedness between offspring in a fruit. Indeed, abortion of embryos is more common in out-crossing than in self-pollinating plants (seeds in cross-pollinating plants are less related than in self-pollinating plants). Moreover, the level of solicitation of resources by the offspring is also increased in cross-pollinating plants: There are several reports that the average weight of crossed seeds is greater than of seeds produced by self-fertilization.

In birds
Some of the earliest examples of parent-offspring conflict were seen in bird broods and especially in raptor species. While parent birds often lay two eggs and attempt to raise two or more young, the strongest fledgling takes a greater share of the food brought by parents and will often kill the weaker sibling (siblicide). Such conflicts have been suggested as a driving force in the evolution of optimal clutch size in birds.

In the blue-footed booby, parent-offspring conflict results in times of food scarcity. When there is less food available in a given year, the older, dominant chick will often kill the younger chick by either attacking directly, or by driving it from the nest. Parents try to prevent siblicide by building nests with steeper sides  and by laying heavier second eggs.

In mammals
Even before POC theory arose, debates took place over whether infants wean themselves or mothers actively wean their infants. Furthermore, it was discussed whether maternal rejections increase infant independence. It turned out that both mother and infant contribute to infant independence. Maternal rejections can be followed by a short-term increase in infant contact but they eventually result in a long-term decrease of contact as has been shown for several primates: In wild baboons infants that are rejected early and frequently spend less time in contact whereas those that are not rejected stay much longer in the proximity of their mother and suckle or ride even in advanced ages. In wild chimpanzees an abrupt increase in maternal rejections and a decrease in mother-offspring contact is found when mothers resume estrus and consort with males. In rhesus macaques a high probability of conception in the following mating season is associated with a high rate of maternal rejection. Rejection and behavioral conflicts can occur during the first months of an infant's life and when the mother resumes estrus. These findings suggest that the reproduction of the mother is influenced by the interaction with their offspring. So there is a potential for conflicts over PI.
It was also observed in rhesus macaques that the number of contacts made by offspring is significantly higher than the number of contacts made by mother during a mating season, whereas the opposite holds for the number of broken contacts. This fact suggests that the mother resists offspring's demands for contact, whereas offspring is apparently more interested in spending time in contact. At three months of infant age a shift from mother to infant in responsibility for maintaining contact takes place. So when the infant becomes more independent, its effort to maintain proximity to its mother increases. This might sound paradoxical but becomes clear when one takes into account that POC increases during the period of PI. In summary, all these findings are consistent with POC-theory.

One might object that time in contact is not a reasonable measure for PI and that, for example, time for milk transfer (lactation) would be a better one. Here one can argue that mother and infant have different thermoregulatory needs due to the fact that they have different surface-to-volume ratios resulting in more rapid loss of heat in infants compared to adults. So infants may be more sensitive to low temperatures than their mothers. An infant might try to compensate by increased contact time with their mother, which could initiate a behavioral conflict over time. Consistency of this hypothesis has been shown for Japanese macaques where decreasing temperatures result in higher maternal rejections and increased number of contacts made by infants.

In social insects

In eusocial species, the parent-offspring conflict takes on a unique role because of haplodiploidy and the prevalence of sterile workers. Sisters are more related to each other (0.75) than to their mothers (0.5) or brothers (0.25). In most cases, this drives female workers to try and obtain a sex ratio of 3:1 (females to males) in the colony. However, queens are equally related to both sons and daughters, so they prefer a sex ratio of 1:1. The conflict in social insects is about the level investment the queen should provide for each sex for current and future offspring. It is generally thought that workers will win this conflict and the sex ratio will be closer to 3:1, however there are examples, like in Bombus terrestris, where the queen has considerable control in forcing a 1:1 ratio.

In humans
An important illustration of POC within humans is provided by David Haig’s (1993) work on genetic conflicts in pregnancy. Haig argued that fetal genes would be selected to draw more resources from the mother than would be optimal for the mother to give. The placenta, for example, secretes allocrine hormones that decrease the sensitivity of the mother to insulin and thus make a larger supply of blood sugar available to the fetus. The mother responds by increasing the level of insulin in her bloodstream and to counteract this effect the placenta has insulin receptors that stimulate the production of insulin-degrading enzymes.

About 30 percent of human conceptions do not progress to full term (22 percent before becoming clinical pregnancies) creating a second arena for conflict between the mother and the fetus. The fetus will have a lower quality cut off point for spontaneous abortion than the mother. The mother's quality cut-off point also declines as she nears the end of her reproductive life, which is significantly seen in older mothers. Older mothers have a higher incidence of offspring with genetic defects. Initially, the maintenance of pregnancy is controlled by the maternal hormone progesterone, but in later stages it is controlled by the fetal human chorionic gonadotrophin released into the maternal bloodstream. The release of fetal human chorionic gonadotrophin causes the release of maternal progesterone. There is also conflict over blood supply to the placenta, with the fetus being prepared to demand a larger blood supply than is optimal for the mother (or even for itself, since high birth weight is a risk factor). This results in hypertension and, significantly, high birth weight is positively correlated with maternal blood pressure.

A tripartite (fetus–mother–father) immune conflict in humans and other placentals

During pregnancy, there is a two-way traffic of immunologically active cell lines through the placenta. Fetal lymphocyte lines may survive in women even decades after giving birth.

See also
Intrauterine cannibalism
The kinship theory of genomic imprinting
Intragenomic and intrauterine conflict in humans

References

External links

Genetic conflicts in human pregnancy
Parent-offspring conflict

Evolutionary biology
Reproduction